Football 5-a-side event at the 2015 Parapan American Games was played from 8–14 August 2015 at the Pan Am / Parapan Am Fields in Toronto.

Participating nations

Medal summary

Medal table

Medal events

Results

Group stage

Finals

Bronze medal match

Gold medal match

See also
Football at the 2015 Pan American Games

References

External links
 Goalball Results

Events at the 2015 Parapan American Games